Cyriacus I (? – 230) succeeded Philadelphus as Bishop of Byzantium and governed the local church for 13 years. In some catalogues appears under the name Cyrillianus.

Sources
Οικουμενικό Πατριαρχείο

Bishops of Byzantium
3rd-century Greek people
3rd-century Romans